= Nede =

Ancient Greek town

Nede (Ancient Greek: Νέδη), also known as Nedeoi (Ancient Greek: Νεδέοι) was a town of ancient Arcadia mentioned by Stephanus of Byzantium.

It took its name from the nymph Nede (Νέδη).

Its site is unlocated.
